Ryo Kiyuna (喜友名諒, Kiyuna Ryō, born 12 July 1990) is an Okinawan karateka. He won the gold medal in the men's kata event at the 2020 Summer Olympics in Tokyo, Japan. He is also a four-time gold medalist in the men's kata event at the World Karate Championships and a two-time gold medalist in the men's team kata event, alongside Arata Kinjo and Takuya Uemura. He has also won multiple gold medals in both the individual and team kata events at the Asian Karate Championships.

Career 

At the 2012 World Karate Championships held in Paris, France, he won one of the bronze medals in the men's individual kata event. The following year, he represented Japan at the 2013 World Games in Cali, Colombia and he won the bronze medal in the men's kata event.

In 2014, at the World Karate Championships held in Bremen, Germany, he won the gold medal in the men's individual kata event. At the 2016 World Karate Championships held in Linz, Austria, he won the gold medal in both the men's individual and men's team kata events. In 2017, he won the gold medal in the men's kata event at the World Games held in Wrocław, Poland. In the final, he defeated Damián Quintero of Spain.

At the 2018 Asian Karate Championships held in Amman, Jordan, he won the gold medal in the men's kata event. A month later, he won the gold medal in the men's kata event at the 2018 Asian Games held in Jakarta, Indonesia. In the final, he defeated Wang Yi-ta of Taiwan. In 2019, at the Asian Karate Championships held in Tashkent, Uzbekistan, he won the gold medal in both the men's individual kata and men's team kata events.

He represented Japan at the 2020 Summer Olympics in Tokyo, Japan. He won the gold medal in the men's kata event, becoming Japan's first gold medalist from Okinawa. In the final, he defeated Damián Quintero of Spain. He was also the flag bearer for Japan during the closing ceremony. A few months after the Olympics, he won the gold medal in the men's kata event at the 2021 World Karate Championships held in Dubai, United Arab Emirates. In December 2021, he won the gold medal in both the men's individual and men's team kata events at the Asian Karate Championships held in Almaty, Kazakhstan.

Personal life 

He studied at Okinawa International University. In December 2020, he contracted COVID-19. 

Kiyuna's mother died in 2019 at the age of 57. At the gold medal ceremony for kata at the Tokyo 2020 Olympics, Kiyuna paid tribute to his mother's support by carrying a framed picture of her during the proceedings.

Achievements

References

External links 

 
 

1990 births
Living people
Japanese male karateka
Karateka at the 2018 Asian Games
Asian Games medalists in karate
Asian Games gold medalists for Japan
Medalists at the 2018 Asian Games
Competitors at the 2013 World Games
Competitors at the 2017 World Games
World Games medalists in karate
World Games gold medalists
World Games bronze medalists
People from Okinawa Island
Karateka at the 2020 Summer Olympics
Olympic karateka of Japan
Olympic medalists in karate
Olympic gold medalists for Japan
Medalists at the 2020 Summer Olympics
21st-century Japanese people